= ColdCell =

Swiss metal band

ColdCell is a Swiss black metal band. They have released five albums, becoming mostly known for Those (2017) on the Czar of Crickets label and the fifth album Age of Unreason (2024) on AOP Records.

== Discography ==
- Generation Abomination (2013)
- Lowlife (2015)
- Those (2017)
- The Greater Evil (2021)
- Age of Unreason (2024)
